Jocelyn Rose Oxlade (born 2 January 1984) is a Filipino-British singer, model and make up artist. She is a former member of the Kitty Girls.

Career
As a child, Oxlade began modeling, joining pageants and participating in theatrical productions. Before moving into the Philippines she competed in Body Shots UK and Miss Philippines UK.   On 10 March 2005, she defeated 25 ladies to represent the Philippines in the Miss Hawaiian Tropic International Pageant. She won the Miss Photogenic and Miss EarthCam Face awards in the 2005 Miss Hawaiian Tropic International Pageant held in Las Vegas, Nevada last 2 May 2005. She was offered a spread in Playboy magazine with a fee of $25,000 which she turned down.

In the Philippines, Oxlade worked as a model, doing projects for Fila, Kamiseta, and Avon, and fronted the all-girl singing group Kitty Girls. She, along with Ayanna Oliva, appeared in all incarnations of the group—originally a quintet with Nicole Deen, Veronica Scott and Tanya Yuquimpo, reduced to a trio when Yuquimpo and Deen left, and to a relaunched Kitty Girls with Khai Lim as third member.

Oxlade has appeared a couple of times in FHM Philippines and was on the cover of the January 2007 FHM Philippines issue with Gwen Garci, and on the cover of the FHM Philippines December 2007 issue with the rest of the Kitty Girls.

Personal life
Oxlade was born and raised in Brighton, East Sussex, the daughter of Filipina Zenaida (née Matias) and Englishman Nigel Oxlade. Oxlade lost her father, at an early age, to cancer. She and her two younger brothers were raised by their mother Zeny.

Oxlade's brother is Burgess Hill Rugby Football Club player and Philippines national rugby union team call up, Ashley Matias Heward.

Oxlade married US Marine Brandon Worley in October 2014 in Denmark. The couple have a daughter, Harley Rose Worley (born July 2015), and currently reside in Oceanside, California, with their dog Ryder.

Filmography

Discography

Guest appearances

Notes

References

External links

Jocelyn Oxlade's Official Website 

1985 births
Living people
English people of Filipino descent
Filipino British musicians
21st-century Filipino women singers
People from Brighton
Miss Hawaiian Tropic delegates
Star Magic
21st-century English women singers
21st-century English singers